Julie Lunde Hansen (born 19 March 1972) is a Norwegian former alpine skier.

Career
During her career she has achieved 3 results among the top 3 in the World Cup.

World Cup results
Top 3

References

External links
 
 

1972 births
Living people
Norwegian female alpine skiers